The following highways are numbered 910:

Costa Rica
 National Route 910

United States